Tsuneo Tamagawa (Japanese: 玉河 恒夫, Tamagawa Tsuneo, 11 December 1925 in Tokyo – 30 December 2017 in New Haven, Connecticut) was a mathematician. He worked on the arithmetic of classical groups.

Tamagawa received his PhD in 1954 at the University of Tokyo under Shōkichi Iyanaga. Tamagawa was a visiting scholar at the Institute for Advanced Study in 1955/6, 1958, and 1970. He has been on the Yale University faculty since 1963, and became emeritus in 1996.

He introduced the Tamagawa numbers, which are measures for algebraic groups over algebraic number fields. These measures play an essential role in conjectures on arithmetic algebraic geometry, such as those of Spencer Bloch and Kazuya Kato.

Tamagawa's doctoral students included Doris Schattschneider and Audrey Terras.

See also 
 Tamagawa number

External links

Yale Bulletin announcing his emeritus status

References

1925 births
2017 deaths
20th-century Japanese mathematicians
21st-century Japanese mathematicians
University of Tokyo alumni
Yale University faculty
Japanese emigrants to the United States
Scientists from Tokyo